The 2020–21 Moldovan Women's Cup was the 24th season of the Moldovan annual football tournament. The competition started on 21 October 2020 and concluded with the final held on 10 June 2021. A total of eight teams had their entries to the tournament.

Quarter-finals
The home teams in the first legs and the pairs were determined in a draw held on 7 October 2020. The first legs were played on 21 October 2020 and the second legs on 18 November 2020 and 28 April 2021.

First legs

Second legs

Semi-finals
The first legs were played on 12 May 2021 and the second legs on 26 May 2021.

First legs

Second legs

Final

The final was played on Thursday 10 June 2021 at the Zimbru Stadium in Chișinău. The "home" team (for administrative purposes) was determined by an additional draw held on 28 May 2021.

References

Moldovan Women's Cup seasons
Moldovan Women's Cup 2020-21
Moldova